Karl Ferdinand Lütgendorf, born Karl Ferdinand Freiherr von Lütgendorf (15 October 1914 – 9 October 1981) was an Austrian soldier and politician who served as the Defense Minister of Austria from 1971 to 1977. He died in 1981, in an apparent suicide, after the discovery of his part in the Lucona affair.

He was a descendant of the air pioneer .

References 

1914 births
1981 deaths
Austrian politicians
Barons of Austria
Theresian Military Academy alumni